Walter Wareham Wade (18 June 1914 – 31 May 2003), known as Billy Wade, was a South African cricketer who played in 11 Test matches between 1938 and 1950. He attended Hilton College along with his brother, Herby, who also played test cricket for South Africa.

References

1914 births
2003 deaths
KwaZulu-Natal cricketers
South Africa Test cricketers
South African cricketers
South African Test cricket umpires
Wicket-keepers
Alumni of Hilton College (South Africa)